Bottin is a surname. Notable people with the surname include:

Guglielmo "William" Bottin (born 1977), Italian music producer, scholar and DJ
Lucien Bottin (1881-?), Belgian wrestler
Rob Bottin (born 1959), American special make-up effects creator
Sébastien Bottin (1764-1853), French statistician